Muling or Muren is a river in Northeast China, a left tributary of the Ussuri.

Jixi and Hulin are located on Muling River.

The area of the river is known by Sino-Soviet conflict (1929) and battles between Soviet and Kwantung Armies.

See also
Muling

Notes

Rivers of Heilongjiang
Tributaries of the Ussuri